Al-Badaya Club  is a Saudi Arabian football (soccer) team in Al-Badaya city playing at the Saudi Fourth Division.

Al-Badaya plays its home games at the al-amal-club-stadium in Al-Badaya. With its so-closed built sets, Al-Amal Stadium can hold 3000 fans.

References

Badaya
Football clubs in Al Badayea